The posterior scrotal veins are veins of the scrotum in men. They accompany the posterior scrotal arteries. They drain into the vesical venous plexus. They help to drain blood from part of the scrotum.

Structure 
The posterior scrotal veins accompany the posterior scrotal arteries. They lie superficially in the scrotum. They drain into the vesical venous plexus.

Function 
The posterior scrotal veins help to drain blood from part of the scrotum in men.

References

External links 
 https://web.archive.org/web/20071024000415/http://anatomy.med.umich.edu/anatomytables/veins_pelvis_perineum.html

Veins of the torso